Robert Sinclair Scott (1843 – 1905) was a Scottish shipbuilder. Along with his brother John they built over a thousand ships at the family firm Scotts Shipbuilding and Engineering Company.

Biography
Robert Sinclair Scott was born into a family of shipbuilder: his father was Charles Cuningham Scott and his mother was Helen Rankin.

See also
John Scott (shipbuilder)
Scotts Shipbuilding and Engineering Company

References

Bibliography

External links
 Scotts Shipbuilding, National Library of Scotland

Scottish engineers
Scottish shipbuilders
1843 births
1905 deaths
19th-century Scottish businesspeople